HD 102272 c is an extrasolar planet approximately 1,200 light-years away in the constellation of Leo.  The planet is orbiting the K-type giant star HD 102272.  The planet was discovered by the radial velocity method, using the Hobby-Eberly Telescope.  Another planet, HD 102272 b, was also discovered orbiting the same star.  Although there is evidence for the existence of this planet, data is insufficient to unambiguously determine its orbit.  The discovery was announced in June 2008. It's thought to have at least 2.6 times the mass of Jupiter.

See also 
 HD 102272 b

References

External links 

 
 

Leo (constellation)
Giant planets
Exoplanets discovered in 2008
Exoplanets detected by radial velocity